Tom McDonald (born 1959) is a retired American soccer defender who played in the North American Soccer League and Major Indoor Soccer League.

McDonald, younger brother of Ken McDonald, graduated from William Tennent High School where he was a 1977 All State soccer player.  He then attended Philadelphia Textile where he was a 1980 Second Team and 1981 First Team All American soccer player.  In January 1982, the Fort Lauderdale Strikers selected McDonald in the first round (tenth overall) of the North American Soccer League draft.  The Strikers released him in March 1982.  He played the 1982-1983 Major Indoor Soccer League season with the Pittsburgh Spirit.

References

External links
 NASL stats

Living people
American soccer players
Fort Lauderdale Strikers (1977–1983) players
Major Indoor Soccer League (1978–1992) players
North American Soccer League (1968–1984) players
Philadelphia Rams soccer players
Pittsburgh Spirit players
Soccer players from Philadelphia
1959 births
All-American men's college soccer players
Association football defenders